Ballycastle railway station was on the Ballycastle Railway which ran from Ballymoney to Ballycastle in Northern Ireland.

History

The station was opened by the Ballycastle Railway on 18 October 1880. It was taken over by the Northern Counties Committee on 4 May 1924.

Under the terms of the Transport Act 1947 the London, Midland and Scottish Railway, the Northern Counties Committee parent company, was nationalised by the British Government on 1 January 1948. The Northern Counties Committee (and the Ballycastle Railway) was thus briefly owned by the British Transport Commission. This was only a temporary measure and in 1949 the NCC was transferred to the Ulster Transport Authority (UTA) – owned by the Government of Northern Ireland.

The station closed to passengers on 3 July 1950.

References 

 
 
 

Disused railway stations in County Antrim
Railway stations opened in 1880
Railway stations closed in 1950
Railway stations in Northern Ireland opened in the 19th century